Jacques Baudin  (14 August 1939 – 25 November 2018) was a Senegalese  politician from Diourbel. He served as Foreign Minister of Senegal from 1998 to 2000. He was member of the Committee on the Elimination of Racial Discrimination.

References

Babacar Ndiaye and Waly Ndiaye, Présidents et ministres de la République du Sénégal, Dakar, 2006 (second edition), p. 69
Annual Report of CERD. A/36/18(SUPP) p. 151

Members of the Committee on the Elimination of Racial Discrimination
Environment ministers of Senegal
Foreign ministers of Senegal
Justice ministers of Senegal
Tourism ministers of Senegal
People from Diourbel Region
1939 births
2018 deaths
Senegalese officials of the United Nations